Herpyllus is a genus of ground spiders first described by Nicholas Marcellus Hentz in 1832.

Species
 it contains thirty-three species, including thirteen from North America:
Herpyllus australis (Holmberg, 1881) – Argentina
Herpyllus bensonae Fox, 1938 – Mexico
Herpyllus brachet Platnick & Shadab, 1977 – Mexico
Herpyllus bubulcus Chamberlin, 1922 – USA, Mexico
Herpyllus calcuttaensis Biswas, 1984 – India
Herpyllus coahuilanus Gertsch & Davis, 1940 – Mexico
Herpyllus cockerelli (Banks, 1901) – USA, Mexico
Herpyllus convallis Chamberlin, 1936 – USA, Mexico
Herpyllus coreanus Paik, 1992 – Korea
Herpyllus ecclesiasticus Hentz, 1832 (type) – North America
Herpyllus emertoni Bryant, 1935 – USA
Herpyllus excelsus Fox, 1938 – USA, Mexico
Herpyllus fidelis (O. Pickard-Cambridge, 1898) – Mexico
Herpyllus frio Platnick & Shadab, 1977 – Mexico
Herpyllus gertschi Platnick & Shadab, 1977 – USA, Mexico
Herpyllus giganteus Platnick & Shadab, 1977 – Mexico
Herpyllus goaensis Tikader, 1982 – India
Herpyllus hesperolus Chamberlin, 1928 – North America
Herpyllus iguala Platnick & Shadab, 1977 – Mexico
Herpyllus lativulvus Denis, 1958 – Afghanistan
Herpyllus malkini Platnick & Shadab, 1977 – Mexico
Herpyllus paropanisadensis Denis, 1958 – Afghanistan
Herpyllus perditus (Banks, 1898) – Mexico
Herpyllus perote Platnick & Shadab, 1977 – Mexico
Herpyllus pictus (F. O. Pickard-Cambridge, 1899) – Mexico
Herpyllus propinquus (Keyserling, 1887) – North America
Herpyllus proximus Denis, 1958 – Turkmenistan, Afghanistan
Herpyllus regnans Chamberlin, 1936 – USA
Herpyllus reservatus Chamberlin, 1936 – USA, Mexico
Herpyllus scholasticus Chamberlin, 1922 – USA
Herpyllus schwarzi (Banks, 1901) – USA
Herpyllus sherus Platnick & Shadab, 1977 – Mexico
Herpyllus vicinus Denis, 1958 – Afghanistan

See also
Cesonia

References

Araneomorphae genera
Gnaphosidae
Spiders of Asia
Spiders of North America